Asu is a Turkish female name that means naughty children.

References

Turkish feminine given names